In graph theory, a BF-graph is a type of directed hypergraph where each hyperedge is directed either to one particular vertex or away from one particular vertex.

In a directed hypergraph, each hyperedge may be directed away from some of its vertices (its tails) and towards some others of its vertices (its heads).
A hyperedge that is directed to a single head vertex, and away from all its other vertices, is called a B-arch. Symmetrically, a hyperedge that is directed away from a single tail vertex, and towards all its other vertices, is called an F-arc.

A hypergraph with only B-arcs is a B-graph and a hypergraph with only F-arcs is a F-graph.

References 
 
 

Hypergraphs